Azeliini is a tribe of flies from the family Muscidae.

Genera
Azelia Robineau-Desvoidy, 1830
Drymeia Meigen, 1826
Hydrotaea Robineau-Desvoidy, 1830
Micropotamia Carvalho, 1993
Ophyra Robineau-Desvoidy, 1830
Potamia Robineau-Desvoidy, 1830
Thricops Rondani, 1856

References

Muscidae
Brachycera tribes
Taxa named by Jean-Baptiste Robineau-Desvoidy